Yanbo Wang (born June 21, 1995) is a Chinese professional wrestler. He is currently signed to WWE, where he performs on the NXT brand under the ring name Boa.

Professional wrestling career 
Wang signed with WWE in September 2016 after attending a tryout in Shanghai. He reported to the WWE Performance Center along with three other Chinese recruits in February 2017. Upon signing with WWE, Wang was known as "Big Boa".

In July 2017, during an NXT live event, Wang, now billed as simply "Boa", teamed with No Way Jose and defeated Steve Cutler and Wesley Blake. Subsequently, he went on to wrestle in several NXT live events. Boa's televised debut in NXT took place on July 10, 2019 when he competed in the NXT Breakout Tournament, where the winner would get an opportunity to challenge for any title in NXT. He was defeated in the first round by eventual winner A. C. H. On the September 11 episode of NXT, Boa was defeated by Damian Priest. On the October 9 episode of NXT, Boa was quickly defeated by Cameron Grimes, and at the end of the match he was attacked by Killian Dain. The following week, Boa was decisively defeated by Dain. In November 2019, he suffered a shoulder injury and had undergone surgery that kept him out of the picture for an unspecified period. On the October 7, 2020 episode of NXT, Boa returned, dressed in a suit and tie, to deliver a letter to Xia Li following her defeat to Shotzi Blackheart. On the November 11 episode of NXT, he appeared to tell Raquel González that Li was not here to have their match, and was subsequently beaten up by her. Afterwards, an elderly man approached Boa and handed him a letter while also leaving a black mark on his hand.

On the November 25 episode of NXT, a vignette aired of Li and Boa, both haggard in appearance, entering the backseat of a vehicle together before being driven to an unknown location. The same elderly man who handed Boa a letter on the November 11 episode of NXT appeared outside of the building, appearing to be waiting for them. Weekly vignettes began airing of both Li and Boa being brutally "punished for their failures", all while being watched over by the elderly man and a mysterious woman in black-and-white face paint named Mei Ying. A transformed Boa returned on January 6, 2021 during NXT's New Year's Evil special, accompanying Li during her match against Katrina Cortez. He made his in-ring return on the June 29 episode of NXT, teaming with Li to defeat Jake Atlas and Mercedes Martinez in a mixed tag team match. On the August 10 episode of NXT, Boa defeated Drake Maverick after he was blinded by Mei Ying's mist. Two weeks later, he suffered a loss against the debuting Xyon Quinn. Boa made an appearance on the September 17 episode of 205 Live and defeated Malik Blade.

In November, Boa was possessed by the spirit of Tian Sha and inherited its powers. He entered into a feud with Solo Sikoa after his alter-ego attacked and choked him backstage on the December 28 episode of NXT. On the January 11, 2022 episode of NXT, Boa and Sikoa fought to a double countout and continued to brawl in the backstage area, resulting in Boa's alter-ego launching a fireball in Sikoa's face. This led to a No Disqualification Falls Count Anywhere match on the January 25 episode of NXT, where Boa lost after Sikoa splashed him through a table.

References

External links
 
 

1995 births
Living people
Sportspeople from Beijing
Chinese male professional wrestlers
21st-century professional wrestlers